Save the Manatee (SMC) is a 501(c)(3) non-profit group and membership organization dedicated to the conservation of manatees. The organization was founded in 1981 by singer and songwriter Jimmy Buffett, and Governor of Florida (and later U.S. Senator) Bob Graham. There are currently about 40,000 active members of SMC.

Save the Manatee Club raises funds from the Adopt-A-Manatee program to go toward public awareness and education projects, manatee research, rescue and rehabilitation efforts, and advocacy and legal action to ensure better protection for manatees and their habitat. The Club has also assisted state and federal governments with research projects in Florida such as aerial surveys, seagrass studies, telemetry studies, manatee photo identification projects, population modeling and the compilation of over twenty years of research on the population of Blue Spring manatees.

International efforts
Save the Manatee Club provides funds, supplies, and other essential equipment to Wildtracks, Belize's only manatee rehabilitation facility. SMC has assisted the Puerto Rico Manatee Conservation Center in raising critical funds needed to repair damage sustained by Hurricane Maria. They also partner with villages in Nigeria, part of the West African manatee’s habitat, providing funding and collaborating with villagers to develop an alternative livelihoods program that provides manatee poachers with a sustainable and legal alternative to taking manatees. Additionally, SMC helps the Caribbean Stranding Network in Puerto Rico provide care for orphaned and injured manatees.

Stated core values

 Supporting the most effective conservation actions possible
 Making science-based decisions and supporting science-driven policies
 Demanding accountability from policy-makers
 Working cooperatively

Adopt-A-Manatee
Save the Manatee Club's membership program is called Adopt-A-Manatee. This program was conceived by Jimmy Buffett in 1984 as a way to increase awareness of the manatee's plight and to get the public involved in their conservation. Currently, the Club has 34 living manatees with known histories available for adoption as well as three memorial adoptions for manatees that have died. The proceeds from this program go toward public awareness and education programs; manatee research, rescue and rehabilitation efforts; and advocacy and legal action to ensure better protection for manatees and their habitat.

Downlisting
On behalf of Save Crystal River, Inc., Pacific Legal Foundation (PLF) petitioned the United States Fish and Wildlife Service (FWS) to downlist the West Indian Manatee (Trichechus manatus) from an endangered to threatened species. PLF contends that FWS has a legal duty under the Endangered Species Act (ESA) to implement this reclassification, because the species no longer qualifies as endangered.

On March 30, 2017, FWS issued its final rule to downgrade the status of the West Indian manatee from endangered to threatened under the ESA. The rule affects both the Florida and Antillean subspecies and was pursued despite strong scientific and legal evidence that shows the downlisting of manatees is not warranted at this time. SMC believes the FWS decision failed to adequately consider data from 2010 to 2016, during which time manatees suffered from unprecedented mortality events linked to habitat pollution, dependence on artificial warm water sources, and record deaths from watercraft strikes. SMC is currently active in opposing the downlisting.

According to the FWS the criteria that need to be meet in order to add a species to the endangered species list, and to keep them there are: 1. the present or threatened destruction, modification, or curtailment of its habitat or range; 2. overutilization for commercial, recreational, scientific, or educational purposes; 3. disease or predation; 4. the inadequacy of existing regulatory mechanisms; 5. other natural or man-made factors affecting its survival. Any one of these conditions is adequate to add a species to the list. However, manatees, and the Florida manatee in particular, are still at substantial risk from habitat loss and motorboat accidents. Additionally, a red tide outbreak at the beginning of 2016 and throughout 2018, and a shortage of FWS personnel to appropriately enforce its regulations regarding endangered species, put the manatee at even greater risk.

References

External links

Organizations established in 1981
Environmental organizations based in Florida
501(c)(3) organizations
Nature conservation organizations based in the United States
Jimmy Buffett
1981 establishments in Florida